Spencer Howson (born 9 March 1972 in England) is an Australian radio presenter.

He was the host of  Breakfast on 612 ABC Brisbane and when he resigned he had worked for the ABC for 25 years.

Career 1990-2016 
Howson's family migrated to Australia in 1981, settling in Brisbane. He obtained a Bachelor of Business (Communication) – Journalism (1989–1991) at the Queensland University of Technology.

Spencer's first radio experience was at Brisbane community station 4RPH, part of the Australia-wide Radio Print Handicapped Network, from 1990 to 1993. In 1991, at the age of 19, Spencer was elected Vice President of the 4RPH board of directors. After an absence of 26 years, he returned to the 4RPH board in February 2019 and currently holds the position of President.

Howson joined ABC Local Radio in the Queensland city of Rockhampton in 1993 and stayed until 1995. He co-produced programmes presented by Andrew Lofthouse and David Anderson as well as presenting the Friday breakfast shift on 4RK (now re-branded as ABC Capricornia). In 1994, when Andrew Lofthouse moved to Brisbane, Spencer took over 4RK's 8.30 am – 11 am shift. The first 15 minutes was a current affairs round-up, networked across regional Queensland.

In 1995 and 1996, Spencer fronted the regional statewide 2–4 pm shift. The programme emanated from Rockhampton until the end of June 1995. Spencer then moved back to Brisbane, whence he continued to present the statewide regional 2–4 pm shift. From 1997 to 2000, Howson presented the 4QR (now re-branded 612 ABC Brisbane) Breakfast Show. In 2001, he returned to his afternoon slot, this time broadcasting into Brisbane as well as regional Queensland.

In 2004 and 2005, Howson hosted the 612 ABC Brisbane 4–6 pm "Late Afternoon Show". He was named ABC Local Radio "Broadcaster of the Year" in 2005.

At the beginning of 2006 Howson returned to the 5 am – 7.45 am Breakfast shift. By the end of the year, the programme was No. 1 in Brisbane. It was the first time since 1984 that 612 ABC Brisbane (formerly 612 4QR) had topped the coveted Breakfast ratings.

In May 2007, Spencer was listed in the inaugural Queensland edition of "Who's Who". The book "recognises and reveres" the 4,000 Queenslanders from the arts, community, business, sports, entertainment, rural, environment, medicine, science, media and politics "who have helped make Queensland what it is today".

In July 2007, Howson joined a "roster" of fill-in presenters back-filling the maternity leave of Jillian Whiting on the Nine Network television show Extra.

Resignation 
In November 2016, Spencer announced that he would be leaving his coveted breakfast show, but will stay with 612 ABC Brisbane. He had been the presenter of the Breakfast shift for eleven years. In December 2016, it was announced that Spencer would be replaced by Queensland Country Hour presenter, Craig Zonca as the host of the station's breakfast program in 2017.

On 6 January 2017 Howson announced that he had officially resigned from the ABC. He had worked for the ABC for 25 years.

Career 2017- 
In February 2017 Howson announced that he would join event podcasting company Pop Up Radio. Founded in 2015, Pop Up Radio provides live-broadcasts of conferences, events and trade shows online. Howson also writes a daily news email The Gateway for newspaper The Brisbane Times. The service launched on 6 February 2017 is written in a conversational style and is sent each morning at 8:30 a.m. Along with this, Howson began tutoring radio students at USQ Springfield. Howson joined the Nine Radio-owned conservative-focused radio station 4BC in January 2021 for the 9-1pm shift on Saturday and Sundays.

Private life 
Howson was born in England but has lived in Brisbane since 1979. He attended primary schools at Bald Hills, Toowong and Manly.  High School was Brisbane Grammar and he then attended the Queensland University of Technology. He married his wife, Nikki, on Mount Coot-tha in June 1996 and they have a son Jack born in 2000.

Awards 
2005 ABC Local Local Radio "Broadcaster of the Year"

2006 Won the ratings slot for Breakfast Radio.

References

External links
Profile at 612 ABC Brisbane
Profile at ABC

English emigrants to Australia
1972 births
Australian radio personalities
Living people
People from Brisbane
Queensland University of Technology alumni